Widemouth was an unincorporated community and coal town located in Mercer County, West Virginia.

The community takes its name from nearby Widemouth Creek.

References 

Coal towns in West Virginia
Unincorporated communities in Mercer County, West Virginia
Unincorporated communities in West Virginia